Jim Capuzzi is a former defensive back and quarterback in the National Football League.

Biography
Capuzzi was born on March 12, 1932, in Niles, Ohio.

Career
Capuzzi played with the Green Bay Packers for two seasons (1955-56). He played at the collegiate level at University of Cincinnati and Marquette University.

See also
List of Green Bay Packers players

References

1932 births
Living people
American football defensive backs
American football quarterbacks
Green Bay Packers players
Cincinnati Bearcats football players
Marquette Golden Avalanche football players
People from Niles, Ohio
Players of American football from Ohio